Beatrice Luigi Gallarde Gomez (born February 23, 1995) is a Filipino model, community development worker, athlete, military sergeant, and beauty pageant titleholder who was crowned Miss Universe Philippines 2021. Making history as the first openly bisexual woman who was crowned Miss Universe Philippines, she represented the Philippines at the Miss Universe 2021 pageant in Eilat, Israel and finished as a Top 5 finalist.

Early life and education
Beatrice Luigi Gallarde Gomez was born on February 23, 1995, in San Fernando, Cebu, Philippines. She was raised by a single mother. She studied at the University of San Jose–Recoletos and pursued a degree in mass communication. At the same time, she also played varsity volleyball for the university. As a student-athlete, she was able to study under an athletic scholarship. In 2022, she graduated from the said university.

Pageantry

Miss Mandaue 2015
Gomez's foray into the world of pageantry began in 2015 when she placed second runner-up at the  Miss Mandaue 2015 pageant.

Binibining Cebu 2020
Gomez represented San Fernando at the Binibining Cebu 2020 pageant and won the title, succeeding Steffi Rose Aberasturi of Mandaue City. She also won the Best in Swimwear, Miss Foton, and Miss Body Worx Medical Spa awards.

Miss Universe Philippines 2021

On September 1, 2021, representing Cebu City, Gomez was confirmed as one of the thirty delegates in the Miss Universe Philippines 2021 pageant.

During the finals on September 30, 2021, Gomez won the Best in Swimsuit, Best in Evening Gown, Miss Cream Silk, and Miss Luxxe ImmunPlus Game Changer awards. At the end of the event, Gomez was crowned by outgoing Miss Universe Philippines 2020 Rabiya Mateo as Miss Universe Philippines 2021.

Gomez made history as the first openly bisexual Miss Universe Philippines winner to compete in Miss Universe.

Miss Universe 2021

Gomez competed at the 70th Miss Universe pageant in Eilat, Israel on December 13, 2021, becoming the last Philippine delegate to qualify to the Miss Universe semifinals during the country's longest streak of appearances in its history in the said round at 12 consecutive years (dating back from 2010). Gomez concluded her Miss Universe journey as a Top 5 finalist together with Valeria Ayos of Colombia, becoming the first openly LGBT delegate to advance to the Miss Universe finals. Harnaaz Sandhu of India won the said pageant.

Military career
In January 2021, she completed the citizens military course training of the Philippine Army Reserve Command in Eastern Visayas which allowed her to be part of the Philippine Navy Reserve Unit, with the rank of corporal. In October 2021, Gomez was promoted to sergeant.

In May 2022, she was named as one of the honorary members, among the first batch, of the newly-launched Friends of Marines, a civilian organization by the Philippine Marine Corps.

Civic involvement and advocacy
Gomez is one of the founders of BEyouthfulPH, an organization that extends assistance in uplifting the lives of disempowered and disadvantaged children in different parts of the Philippines. One of the organization's programs focuses on children in conflict with the law, guiding and inspiring them to become more proactive and law-abiding Filipino citizens.

In an interview, Gomez, who identifies as bisexual, also says she "hopes that younger LGBTQIA+ people would be free from bullying and violence:

Just like what everyone hopes for in the LGBTQIA+, I aspire for acceptance and inclusivity — especially equal rights and protection for the younger generation who oftentimes suffer from bullying and different forms of violence. They are left to fend for themselves, particularly those that are oppressed by their own parents."

Gomez also holds the presidency of the Rotary International Rotaract Club of Metro Mandaue.

Personal life
Gomez is an openly bisexual woman. She was previously in a relationship with disc jockey and entrepreneur Kate Jagdon.

Gomez also does boxing, scuba diving, and mixed martial arts.

Gomez is first cousin to the late Rizzini Alexis Gomez, Miss Tourism International 2012–2013 and niece of former Philippine Basketball Association player Roel Gomez.

References

External links

1995 births
Bisexual women
Bisexual military personnel
Living people
Filipino bisexual people
Filipino LGBT entertainers
Filipino LGBT sportspeople
LGBT models
Miss Universe 2021 contestants
Miss Universe Philippines winners
People from Cebu City
Cebuano people
Visayan people
Cebuano female models
21st-century Filipino LGBT people
Cebuano beauty pageant winners